Chal Bash (also Romanized as Chāl Bāsh) is a village in Jeyransu Rural District, in the Central District of Maneh and Samalqan County, North Khorasan Province, Iran. At the 2006 census, its population was 21, in 9 families.

References 

Populated places in Maneh and Samalqan County